Dr. Kung Yan-sum, (born in 1943 in Shanghai), is the younger brother of Nina Wang Kung Yu-sum, the former Asia's richest woman and the late chairman of Chinachem Group, one of the biggest privately held property developer in Hong Kong. He is a doctor and he has a private clinic in Hong Kong Garden, Tsing Lung Tau, Tsuen Wan.

Since his sister's death in 2007, he has been temporarily in charge of managing Chinachem Group. He is representing Chinachem Group to fight a legal battle against Tony Chan Chun Chuen, a Fung Shui master who claimed he was the sole beneficiary of Nina's fortune.

References
 Teddy Wang: brother-in-law of Kung Yan-sum
 Nina Wang: sister of Kung Yan-sum

1943 births
Living people
Chinachem
Hong Kong billionaires
Hong Kong medical doctors
Hong Kong business executives
Businesspeople from Shanghai
Billionaires from Shanghai
Physicians from Shanghai